Bibi is a given name, nickname and surname.

Notable people with this name

As a nickname or stage name 
 Bibi Andersson (1935-2019), Swedish actress
 Bibi (artist) (born 1964), French visual artist Fabrice Cahoreau
 Bibi Baskin (born 1952), Irish former television and radio presenter
 Bibi Besch (1940–1996), Austrian-American actress
 Bibi Bourelly (born 1994), German singer and songwriter
 Bibi (futsal player), Portuguese futsal player Emanuel Luís Marques Walter de Magalhães (born 1980)
 Bibi Lindström (1904–1984), Swedish art director
 Bibi Osterwald (1918–2002), American actress
 Bibi (singer) (born 1998), South Korean singer
 Bibi Torriani (1911–1988), Swiss hockey player and luger
 Bibi Zhou (born 1985), Chinese singer
 Benjamin Netanyahu (born 1949), 9th prime minister of Israel from 1996 to 1999 and 2009-2021
 Bianca Andreescu (born 2000), Canadian professional tennis player
 Stefano Battistelli (born 1970), Italian former swimmer

As a given name 
 Bibi Aisha, Afghan civilian woman
 Bibi Amtus Salam (died 1985), Indian social worker and disciple of Mahatma Gandhi
 Bibi Ayesha, Afghan military leader
 Bibi Medoua (born 1993), Cameroonian football defender
 Bibi Russell (born 1950), Bangladeshi fashion designer, businessperson and former model
 Bibiana Fernández (born 1954), Spanish actress, singer and model

As a surname 
 Aisha Bibi, 12th-century noble woman, after whom a memorial and village are named in modern Kazakhstan
 Aryeh Bibi (born 1943), Israeli politician
 Asia Bibi (born 1971), Pakistani Christian woman Aasiya Noreen who was acquitted of blasphemy
 Bushra Bibi, wife of Imran Khan and First Lady of Pakistan
 Chand Bibi (1550–1599 CE), also known as Chand Khatun or Chand Sultana, Indian Muslim woman warrior.

 Jonathan Bibi (born 1984), Seychellois football player
 Mordechai Bibi (1922–2023), Israeli politician
 Mukhtaran Bibi (born , now known as Mukhtār Mā'ī), survivor of a gang rape in Pakistan
 Noorjahan Kakon Bibi, female freedom fighter in Bangladesh
 Pari Bibi, 17th-century noble woman buried in Lalbagh Fort, Dhaka, Bangladesh
 Taramon Bibi, female freedom fighter in Bangladesh
Taj Bibi, consort of Mughal Emperor Jahangir and mother of Shah Jahan
 Yigal Bibi (born 1942), Israeli former politician

Fictional characters
 Bibi Z99944X, one of the main characters of Canadian TV series Bibi et Geneviève
 The title character of Bibi Blocksberg, a German children's radio series
 Bibi Dahl, character from the James Bond film For Your Eyes Only played by Lynn-Holly Johnson
 Bibi, character in Brawl Stars

Other
 Bibi, a lioness and member of the Marsh Pride featured for many years on the BBC series Big Cat Diary

See also
 Ibn Bibi, 13th century Iranian historian
 BB (disambiguation)

Lists of people by nickname
Bengali Muslim surnames